General Tapishwar Narain Raina  (24 January 1921 – 19 May 1980), best known as T.N. Raina, was a senior army officer and a diplomat who served as the 9th Chief of the Army Staff of the Indian Army between 1975 and 1978.

Upon retirement, he was appointed as the High Commissioner of India to Canada. He was a recipient of the third highest civilian honour of India, the Padma Bhushan.

Early life and education
Raina was born in a Kashmiri Pandit family on 24 January 1921, the son of Rai Bahadur A. N. Raina, sometime Postmaster-General of Punjab. He received his early education in Ludhiana, where his father had been posted as Head Postmaster. While a college student in Lahore, at the University of the Punjab, Raina joined the 4th Punjab University Training Corps in October 1938.

Career

Second World War
On 1 May 1941, Raina was attached to the 10th Battalion of the 8th Punjab Regiment, but subsequently considered the air force and briefly served as a cadet in the Indian Air Force during July–August 1941. He then joined the Officers' Training School at Mhow. On 12 April 1942, Raina received an emergency commission as a second lieutenant in the 10th Battalion of 19th Hyderabad Regiment, which became the Kumaon Regiment in 1948. Raina initially joined 10/19 Hyderabad, then at Agra, but was posted to 2/19 Hyderabad in December 1942. In March 1943, he was posted to 1/19 Hyderabad, stationed in Iraq. 1/19 Hyderabad was then part of the 24th Indian Infantry Brigade, attached to the 6th Indian Infantry Division. By the time Raina joined his battalion in Iraq, the major actions in which Iraqforce had been involved in were over. While at Kirkuk, Raina was seriously wounded in a grenade-throwing accident which left him with severe wounds in his thighs and resulted in the loss of an eye. He had a glass eye in place for the rest of his career in the army.

In July 1944, Raina's battalion returned to India and was attached to the 26th Indian Infantry Brigade, which that December was sent to Burma attached to the 36th Indian Infantry Division He was mentioned in dispatches for his service in the Burma Campaign.

Post-Independence
He was the Brigade Commander at Chushul in Ladakh during November 1962. He was awarded the Maha Vir Chakra for his handling of the Battle of Chushul. He was a veteran of the 1962 war and 1971 wars.

On 5 January 1965, Lieutenant-Colonel Raina was appointed Brigadier General Staff (BGS) of the XXXIII Corps in West Bengal.

On 7 October 1971, Raina was appointed General Officer Commanding of II Corps in the Khulna sector, with the acting rank of Lieutenant General. Raina was awarded the Padma Bhushan for his contributions in the War.

Raina was appointed GOC-in-C, Western Command on 27 October 1973. He served as the Chief of Army Staff of the Indian Army from 1 June 1975 to 31 May 1978.

During his tenure as the COAS, the central government led by Indira Gandhi declared a state of national emergency in India. Before the imposition of the emergency, it is believed that the Prime Minister asked for the Army's support in the venture, but General Raina bluntly told the Prime Minister  that the army would not be used to 'further her ends' but obey only those orders of a 'legally construed government.'  . This was considered a crucial moment that kept the Indian Army out of politics at a critical juncture.

Later life
Raina died on 19 May 1980 in Ottawa, while serving as India's High Commissioner to Canada. Following his funeral and cremation with full military honours in Delhi on 25 May, his son-in-law, together with his nephew, Squadron Leader K. K. Zalpuri, immersed his ashes in the Ganges at Haridwar on 27 May.

Personal life
On 25 February 1949, Raina married Marie Antoinette Florence Kurtz, who was French. The couple had a son, Jyotishwar Narain (1949–March 1974) and a daughter, Anita (born 1952). Jyoti Narain, who followed his father into the Army and joined his old regiment, was killed in a motorcycle accident in March 1974. Anita married Arun Thapan.

Awards and decorations

Dates of rank

Notes

References

External links
Bio of General Tapishwar Narain Raina on Bharat Rakshak
Chronological list of Indian Commanders-in-Chief since 1947

1921 births
1980 deaths
Kashmiri Hindus
Kashmiri Pandits
People from Srinagar
Kashmiri people
Chiefs of Army Staff (India)
Recipients of the Maha Vir Chakra
Generals of the Indo-Pakistani War of 1971
Recipients of the Padma Bhushan in civil service
High Commissioners of India to Canada
Indian generals
National Defence College, India alumni